Netechma tenuifascia is a species of moth of the family Tortricidae. It is found in Tungurahua Province, Ecuador.

The wingspan is 20 mm. The ground colour of the forewings is yellowish cream with a slight brownish admixture and with brown dots. The markings are dark brown. The hindwings are white cream, but creamer apically.

References

Moths described in 2009
Netechma